Matthew Flatt is an American computer scientist and professor at the University of Utah School of Computing in Salt Lake City. He is also a member of the core development team for the Racket programming language.

Flatt received his PhD at Rice University in 1999, under the direction of Matthias Felleisen. His dissertation is on the mechanics of first-class modules and mixin classes. His work triggered research in the ML community on mutually recursive modules and in the object-oriented community on mixins and traits.

Flatt served as one of four editors of the Revised^6 Report on the Scheme programming language. The report is influenced by his design of Racket, especially the module system, the exception system, the record system, the macro system, and library links.

References

External links
Flatt's homepage at Utah
Google Scholar profile

Programming language researchers
Lisp (programming language) people
Living people
Rice University alumni
University of Utah faculty
Year of birth missing (living people)
Carnegie Mellon University alumni